John Soko (5 May 1968 – 27 April 1993) was a Zambian football player and member of the national team.  He was among those killed in the crash of the team plane in Gabon in 1993.

Career
Soko played club football for Nkana F.C. in Zambia.

Soko made several appearances for the Zambia national football team and participated in the 1990 and 1992 African Cup of Nations finals.

References

External links

1968 births
1993 deaths
Zambian footballers
Zambia international footballers
1990 African Cup of Nations players
1992 African Cup of Nations players
Victims of aviation accidents or incidents in Gabon
Nkana F.C. players
Association football defenders
Footballers killed in the 1993 Zambia national football team plane crash